Denison Cabral is a retired Brazilian-American soccer forward /midfielder who played professionally in the Continental Indoor Soccer League, National Professional Soccer League and USISL. He played three games for the United States national futsal team at the 2008 FIFA Futsal World Cup, scoring one goal for the American team. In 2007 the Brazilian-American participated in his first official FIFA event as a member of the  US Futsal Men's team in the 2007 Pan American games in Rio de Janeiro, Brasil. Denison served as the captain of the United States national futsal Team in the world cup qualifying tournament CONCACAF in Guatemala 2008.

Cabral began his career with Sadia F.A. and Palmeiras. In 1994, he moved to the United States to train and perhaps play with a local outdoor team. While in Florida, he saw an indoor game on television. He decided to attend a trial with the Washington Warthogs of the Continental Indoor Soccer League and gained a contract. Cabral went on to play four seasons with the Warthogs. In the fall of 1995, Cabral attended an open tryout with the Baltimore Bays of the USISL. He impressed the Bay’s coach, Kevin Healey, enough to gain a contract. Since the Warthogs played a summer indoor season and the Bays played from November through February, this allowed Cabral to move between the two teams without conflict. In his first season with the Bays, Cabral won the USISL indoor championship, scoring five goals in the final and gaining both regular season and playoff MVP awards. Cabral began the 1997–98 USISL I-League season with the Bays. In January 1998, the Bays released Cabral to allow him to sign with the Baltimore Spirit of the National Professional Soccer League as the Spirit released Jason Dieter in order to allow him to sign with the Bays. That summer the Spirit were renamed the Baltimore Blast. Cabral remained with the Blast until September 2010, when the Blast released Cabral after the team could not come to a contract agreement with him. In November 2004, he injured his right knee, losing most of the season. Then in February 2006, he injured his left knee, again losing most of the season. During his years with Baltimore, Cabral won five championships (2003, 2004, 2006, 2008, 2009), was a six-time All Star, and was MVP of the 2003 championship series.

Cabral was named the head coach of the Harrisburg Heat prior to the 2016-2017 MASL Season. Cabral lead the Heat to a 10-10 record, and their first playoff appearance in the MASL, being named Coach of the Year in the process.

In 2023, the Baltimore Blast retired jersey #5 to honor Cabral and Mike Stankovic.

International
In May 2007, Cabral became an American citizen.  He immediately began to play for the United States national futsal team, participating in the 2007 Pan American games in Rio, 2008 COMCACAF in Guatemala,  and at the 2008 FIFA Futsal World Cup.

External links
 SportsPlex: Denison Cabral
 FIFA: Denison Cabral

References

Living people
1974 births
American soccer players
American soccer coaches
American men's futsal players
Baltimore Bays (1993–1998) players
Baltimore Blast (NPSL) players
Baltimore Blast (2001–2008 MISL) players
Baltimore Blast (2008–2014 MISL) players
Baltimore Spirit players
Brazilian expatriate footballers
Brazilian footballers
Continental Indoor Soccer League players
Major Indoor Soccer League (2001–2008) players
Major Indoor Soccer League (2008–2014) players
National Professional Soccer League (1984–2001) players
USISL players
Washington Warthogs players
Association football forwards
Association football midfielders
Expatriate soccer players in the United States
Brazilian expatriate sportspeople in the United States
Brazilian emigrants to the United States
Harrisburg Heat (MASL) players
Major Arena Soccer League coaches
Player-coaches
Sportspeople from Florianópolis